Chris Eliasen (born July 4, 1971) is an American writer of fantasy and science fiction.

Personal background 
Christopher Eric Eliasen was born on July 4, 1971. He is married to Shea Eliasen. They have two daughters and reside in St. Paul, Minnesota. He holds an undergraduate degree in political science and an MBA concentrated in applications of high technology. In addition to writing, he works as a business analyst and teaches at two universities. He serves on the board of directors of the Center for Irish Music.

Editing 
In 2013, Eliasen served as an editor for the Enter the Unknown role-playing game supplement for Star Wars: Edge of the Empire, produced by Fantasy Flight Games.

References

External links 
 

1971 births
American fantasy writers
American science fiction writers
Living people
People from Minnesota